Chencun is a town in the Shunde district of Foshan (a prefecture-level city) in China's Guangdong Province. It is popular with its flower planting and has become a production base of fresh flowers.

References

See also
 Ou Daren
 Ou Shizi

Shunde District
Towns in Guangdong